First-seeded Ken Rosewall defeated Lew Hoad 9–7, 6–4, 6–4 in the final to win the men's singles tennis title at the 1955 Australian Championships.

Seeds
The seeded players are listed below. Ken Rosewall is the champion; others show the round in which they were eliminated.

  Ken Rosewall (champion)
  Vic Seixas (quarterfinals)
  Rex Hartwig (semifinals)
  Tony Trabert (semifinals)
  Lew Hoad (finalist)
  Sven Davidson (third round)
  Mervyn Rose (quarterfinals)
  Lennart Bergelin (quarterfinals)
  Don Candy (second round)
  Roger Becker (third round)
  Neale Fraser (third round)
 n/a
  George Worthington (third round)
  Michael Green (third round)
  Ashley Cooper (quarterfinals)
  Gerald Moss (third round)

Draw

Key
 Q = Qualifier
 WC = Wild card
 LL = Lucky loser
 r = Retired

Finals

Earlier rounds

Section 1

Section 2

Section 3

Section 4

External links
 

1956
1955 in Australian tennis